Glencoe Mill Village Historic District is a national historic district located at Glencoe, Alamance County, North Carolina. It encompasses 48 contributing buildings and 6 contributing structures built between 1880 and 1882 in Glencoe.

The district consists of three parts: 1) a manufacturing and commercial complex; 2) a power and water system; and 3) a residential and social unit.  The complex includes a three-story, Italianate style main mill building, a wheel house, a one-story picker house, a dye-house, finishing room and napper house, cotton warehouses and other storage buildings, and an office and company store complex.

Steam engines were added to the Dye House, Finishing and Napper rooms by 1905.

The residential and social unit includes 41 frame dwellings, some with detached kitchens and outbuildings, a lodge, and the ruins of the village church.

The  property was purchased on January 26, 1878 for $8000 by E. M. Holt & Sons.  An additional  was purchased the following year. The Holts established other cotton mills throughout Alamance County because of the "abundant water power drew workers from and supplemented local agriculture" according to a Historic American Engineering Record prepared in 1977.

It was added to the National Register of Historic Places in 1979. The building which once housed management offices and the company store was established as a museum in 2002.

See also 

 Textile Heritage Museum
 Bellemont Mill Village Historic District
 Alamance Mill Village Historic District

References

External links

Historic American Engineering Record in North Carolina
Historic districts on the National Register of Historic Places in North Carolina
Italianate architecture in North Carolina
Historic districts in Alamance County, North Carolina
National Register of Historic Places in Alamance County, North Carolina
Company towns in North Carolina